The High-Flux Advanced Neutron Application Reactor (HANARO) (하나로) is a 30 MW multi-purpose research reactor located at Daejeon, Republic of Korea. It was designed by Korea Atomic Energy Research Institute (KAERI) as a facility for research and development on the neutron science and its applications.
HANARO has been playing a significant role as a national facility in the area of neutron science, the production of key radioisotopes, material testing for power reactor application, neutron transmutation doping (NTD), neutron activation analysis, and neutron radiography. After the installation of a cold neutron source in 2010, it has been also serving as a regional and international facility for neutron science.

Notes

References 
 High-Flux Advanced Neutron Application Reactor (HANARO)
 General Information
 Current Status and the Future of the Irradiation Services in the HANARO Reactor

External links 

 https://www.kaeri.re.kr/board?menuId=MENU00419 HANARO official web site in Korean
 https://www.kaeri.re.kr/mpse Korea Atomic Energy Research Institute
 http://www.neutron.or.kr/ The Korean Neutron Beam User's Association
 http://www.icns2017.org/ The International Conference on Neutron Scattering in 2017

Science and technology in South Korea
Neutron facilities
Nuclear research reactors